Drell is a surname. Notable people with the surname include:
Sidney Drell, American theoretical physicist
Persis Drell, American particle physicist
Dee D. Drell, American judge
Henri Drell (born 2000), Estonian basketball player

Other uses
Archie Bell & the Drells, an R&B vocal group
 The drell, an alien race from the fictional universe of Mass Effect
 Thane Krios, a notable member of the drell race